Driven is Orphanage's fifth album, released in April 2004 by Nuclear Blast records. The CD features 14 tracks that have been recorded at Studio Moskou in Utrecht and was mixed and mastered at Studio Double Noise in Tilburg.

Track listing

Personnel

 Gus Eikens - guitars, keyboards, vocals
 George Oosthoek - grunts & screams
 Rosan van der Aa - vocals
 Sureel - drums & clay pot
 Lasse Dellbrügge - synths & sound design
 Remko van der Spek - bass guitar & guitars

2004 albums
Orphanage (band) albums